Mount Grant is an 8,590-foot-elevation (2,618 meter) mountain summit located in Flathead County in the U.S. state of Montana.

Description

Mount Grant is situated in the Great Bear Wilderness on land managed by Flathead National Forest. Mount Grant is in the Flathead Range, west of the Continental Divide, and the nearest higher peak is Great Northern Mountain, one mile to the northwest. Precipitation runoff from the mountain drains east into Tunnel Creek, which is a tributary of Middle Fork Flathead River, and the west slope drains to Hungry Horse Reservoir.

Climate 
According to the Köppen climate classification system, the mountain is located in an alpine subarctic climate zone with long, cold, snowy winters, and cool to warm summers. This climate supports the Grant Glacier on the east slope. Winter temperatures can drop below −10 °F with wind chill factors below −30 °F. Due to its altitude, it receives precipitation all year, as snow in winter, and as thunderstorms in summer.

See also

 Geology of the Rocky Mountains

References

External links
 Mount Grant: Weather

Mountains of Flathead County, Montana
Mountains of Montana
North American 2000 m summits